Roy Lorin Pinn (May 9, 1888 – June 3, 1950) was an American carpenter and politician.

Born in Unique, Iowa, Pinn was a journeyman carpenter and was involved with the state executive council of carpenters. He served as clerk and director of the school district in the Town of Dairyland, Wisconsin in Douglas County, Wisconsin. In 1929, Pinn served in the Wisconsin State Assembly on the Wisconsin Progressive Party ticket.

Notes

1888 births
1950 deaths
People from Douglas County, Wisconsin
People from Humboldt County, Iowa
School board members in Wisconsin
Wisconsin Progressives (1924)
20th-century American politicians
Members of the Wisconsin State Assembly